The National Poetry Slam (NPS) is a performance poetry competition where teams from across the United States, Canada, and, occasionally, Europe and Australia, participate in a large-scale poetry slam.  The event occurs in early August every year and in different U.S. cities.

History 
The first National Poetry Slam was held at Fort Mason in 1990 in San Francisco.  It was organized by poet Gary Mex Glazner and featured three competing teams: Chicago (birthplace of slam), New York City (Nuyorican), and San Francisco (host city). It has been held every year since.
2014).

From 1990 to 2007, the National Poetry Slam held an individual poetry competition (known as "indies") simultaneously with the team competition, with the poets earning the highest ranking individual poems during the first two days of competition moving on the semifinal and final rounds. The first winner of this event was Patricia Smith, who would go on to win the Individual National Poetry Slam Championship title a record four times.

Starting in 2004, Poetry Slam Inc. (PSI) began hosting a separate event called the Individual World Poetry Slam (IWPS), in which solo poets, rather than teams, competed for the championship title. Because of the popularity of iWPS and to avoid the confusion of two "individual" poetry slam titles being awarded ever year, Poetry Slam Inc. decided to cancel the "indie" competition at the National Poetry Slam.

In 2008, the "Indie Finals" was replaced with the "Group Piece Finals," in which the teams with the highest ranking group pieces (multi-voice poems featuring more than one poet) competed for the title. Only teams who weren't already eligible for NPS semifinals were allowed to compete, with New York, NYC-Urbana being the first Group Piece Finals championship team.

Also in 2008, the Women of the World Poetry Slam (WOWPS) was introduced, in which only female and female-identified poets are allowed to compete. The first WOWPS was held in Detroit, Michigan and the first WOWPS champion was Andrea Gibson.

In 2008, poet Harlym 125 created an unofficial individual competition called the National Underground Poetry Individual Competition (NUPIC) as a response to the absence of an individual competition at NPS. The winner of this competition has traditionally been given a showcase spot on the finals stage at NPS.

The National Poetry Slam has also been the subject of several feature-length documentaries, including the 1998 Paul Devlin film SlamNation, and the 2006 Kyle Fuller and Mike Henry film Slam Planet.

Results by year

Team Finalists

Individual Finalists at NPS

Group Piece Finalists at NPS

National Underground Poetry Individual Competition (NUPIC) Champion

Individual World Poetry Slam (iWPS)

Women of the World Poetry Slam (WOWPS)

See also
Individual World Poetry Slam
List of performance poets
Oral poetry
Performance poetry
Poetry Slam
Poetry Slam, Inc.
Spoken word
Women of the World Poetry Slam

References

External links 
 National Poetry Slam 2008 Website
 Official Poetry Slam Incorporated Homepage
 SF Hosting Poetry Slam

Performance art festivals
Poetry slams

Poetry organizations